Vladimir Petrovich Mityushov (born 17 October 1960) is a Russian rower. He competed in the men's lightweight coxless four event at the 1996 Summer Olympics.

References

External links
 

1960 births
Living people
Russian male rowers
Olympic rowers of Russia
Rowers at the 1996 Summer Olympics
People from Orenburg
Sportspeople from Orenburg Oblast